Papish v. Board of Curators of University of Missouri is a court case that was heard and decided by the U.S. Supreme Court on March 19, 1973.

In 1969, Barbara Susan Papish, a graduate student at the University of Missouri, distributed a newspaper containing a political cartoon of policemen raping the Statue of Liberty and the Goddess of Justice with the caption “With Liberty and Justice for All.” She and three of her classmates were arrested for "possessing and attempting to sell obscene literature". The university tried to expel Papish for violating their student conduct code that prohibited “indecent conduct or speech” and the lower courts agreed. In 1973, the Supreme Court overturned the lower ruling, rejecting the notion that such content-based discipline could be justified, and ruled that public universities couldn’t punish students for offensive speech that didn’t cause disruption or interfere with the rights of others. The Court held that the school's expulsion of Papish violated the First Amendment.

References 

United States Supreme Court cases of the Burger Court
Freedom of speech in the United States
Student rights case law in the United States
Higher education case law
United States Supreme Court cases
1973 in United States case law